Defne Kayalar (born 7 May 1975) is a Turkish actress. She is best known to international audiences for her role in the 2020 Netflix series Ethos.

Life and career
Kayalar is a graduate of the Graphics Department of Bilkent University in Ankara. She later worked as an assistant in the Department of Cinema and Television at Istanbul Bilgi University.

In 2003, Kayalar produced the series Alacakaranlık with Uğur Yücel and in 2004, she co-produced the film Toss-Up. In 2013, she was a regular in the series 20 Dakika, and the following year, she had a recurring role in the teen drama Medcezir. The same year, she married Ali Bilgin, the show's director. In 2015, she appeared in the Bilgin-directed film Delibal. In 2020, Kayalar gained prominence with the role of the psychiatrist Peri in the Netflix series Ethos.

Selected filmography

Film

Television

References

External links
 

1975 births
Living people
Turkish film actresses
Turkish television actresses
Actresses from İzmir
Bilkent University alumni